Commodore John Bladen Tinker (c.1725 – 19 July 1767) was a senior Royal Navy officer who served as Commander-in-Chief, East Indies Station from 1763 to 1765.

Naval career
Tinker joined the Royal Navy in 1741. Promoted to captain on 4 July 1756, he was given command of the sixth-rate . He went on to command, successively, the third-rate , the fifth-rate  and the sixth-rate . His last command was the fourth-rate  in which he sailed out to the far east and served as Commander-in-Chief, East Indies Station from 1763 to 1765.

References

Royal Navy commodores
1725 births
1767 deaths